Falkenried was a former tram and metro carriage developer and manufacturer (1882–1965) as well as a bus developer (until 1980) based in Hamburg, Germany. In 1918 it became part of Hamburger Hochbahn plc, since June 1968 it is a subsidiary of it. The name Falkenried originates of the street in Eppendorf where the factory was situated (until 1999). Today it is a bus maintenance subsidiary of the Hochbahn located at a bus garage in Hummelsbüttel.

In 1897, the company made a delivery of fifteen horsecars to Kristiania Sporveisselskab of Oslo, Norway. For Kristiania Elektriske Sporvei, the company built one tram and trailer in 1899, four trams in 1913/14 and two in 1925.

References

Manufacturing companies based in Hamburg
Rolling stock manufacturers of Germany
German companies established in 1882